Larisa Lezhnina is a principal dancer with Dutch National Ballet, Amsterdam. She was born on March 17, 1969, in Leningrad (now St. Petersburg), Russia. She graduated from the Vaganova Ballet Academy in Leningrad in 1987 and joined the Kirov Ballet (now the Mariinsky Ballet). In 1990 she became a First Soloist. She left the Mariinsky in 1994 and joined the Dutch National Ballet as a principal.

Main Repertoire
The Nutcracker (with Kirov Ballet, 1994)
The Sleeping Beauty (with Kirov Ballet, coached by Irina Kolpakova)
Swan Lake (Dutch National Ballet, 2011)

See also
List of Russian ballet dancers

Notes

External links
The Ballerina Gallery - Larissa Lezhnina
Dutch National Ballet
Mariinsky Ballet company website
Vaganova Ballet Academy

1969 births
Living people
Prima ballerinas
Russian ballerinas
Dutch National Ballet principal dancers
20th-century Russian ballet dancers
21st-century Russian ballet dancers